The 2019 Milano–Torino was the 100th edition of the Milano–Torino cycling classic. The race was rated as a 1.HC event on the 2019 UCI Europe Tour.

Results

References

2019 UCI Europe Tour
2019 in Italian sport
Milano–Torino